is a passenger railway station in the city of Tondabayashi, Osaka Prefecture, Japan, operated by the private railway company Kintetsu Railway.

Lines

Station layout
The station consists of two opposed side platforms connected to the station building by a level crossing.

Platforms

Adjacent stations

History
Takidanifudō Station opened on March 25,1902.

Passenger statistics
In fiscal 2018, the station was used by an average of 6914 passengers daily

Surrounding area
 Takidani Fudo Myo-ji Temple
Osaka Ohtani University
 Hatsushiba Tondabayashi Junior and Senior High School
Tondabayashi Municipal Nishiki-gun Elementary School

See also
List of railway stations in Japan

References

External links

 Takidanifudō Station  

Railway stations in Japan opened in 1902
Stations of Kintetsu Railway
Railway stations in Osaka Prefecture
Tondabayashi, Osaka